Telecaribe is a regional television network for the Caribbean region of Colombia.

History
The station was set up in the early 1980s in Valledupar, Colombia and was created by a local entrepreneur named Jose Jorge Dangond. It started as an unlicensed TV station and as a personal hobby with aficionado equipment brought from the United States, transmitting American movies and local vallenato musical groups, including first versions of the Vallenato Legend Festival. Dangond's family and friends in Valledupar nicknamed it Televallenato or Rope TV, because all the antennae and equipment were attached with ropes onto one of the highest buildings in the city.

By 1986 the Colombian Ministry of Communications detected the channel's signal and seized all the equipment. Dangond then started a legal battle to legalize the channel, which developed into a congressional proposal to create regional TV channels for every region of Colombia. Thus were born Telecaribe, Teleantioquia, Telepacífico, and other regional TV stations.

On this same year (on April 28), the station formally became Telecaribe, and the main equipment and studios were then moved to Barranquilla where it continued to develop and cover the entirety of Colombia's Caribbean region by setting up franchises or TV stations in the seven major cities of this region. Dangond was its founder and first director for almost 6 years before he was appointed consul general in Venezuela.

TELECARIBE is the third national TV channel most watched in northern Colombia.

Since 2018, Telecaribe took over the broadcast rights to the Miss Colombia pageant from former broadcaster RCN Television. While being a nationally owned regional broadcaster, its cable and digital coverage nationwide enables it to broadcast the event on all platforms (including online).

References

External links
 Official Site 

Spanish-language television stations
Television networks in Colombia
Mass media in Valledupar
Mass media in Barranquilla